DZBA (106.1 FM) is a radio station owned and operated by Mabini Colleges under the College of Liberal Arts. Its studios and transmitter are located along Gov. Panotes Ave., Daet.

References

External links
DZBA FB Page

Radio stations in Camarines Norte